Robbie Devereux (born 31 January 1971) is an English former professional footballer.

Biography
Born in Great Cornard, Devereux played for the Ipswich Town youth team, but was released by the club. He signed for Colchester United in 1989, but was released the following year after only two league appearances and dropped into non-League to sign for hometown club Cornard United.

In 1992, he briefly returned to Colchester, making six appearances, before signing for Irish club Shelbourne. In Ireland, he also played for Dundalk and St Patrick's Athletic, before returning to England to play for Southport, making seven appearances in the Football Conference. After a trial at Dagenham & Redbridge, he also played for AFC Sudbury, where he ended his career after making 77 appearances for the club. He currently runs a roofing company in the Sudbury area.

References

1971 births
People from Babergh District
English footballers
Colchester United F.C. players
Cornard United F.C. players
Shelbourne F.C. players
Dundalk F.C. players
St Patrick's Athletic F.C. players
Southport F.C. players
A.F.C. Sudbury players
Living people
Association football midfielders